The San Juan–Chama Project is a U.S. Bureau of Reclamation interbasin water transfer project located in the states of New Mexico and Colorado in the United States. The project consists of a series of tunnels and diversions that take water from the drainage basin of the San Juan River – a tributary of the Colorado River – to supplement water resources in the Rio Grande watershed. The project furnishes water for irrigation and municipal water supply to cities along the Rio Grande including Albuquerque and Santa Fe.

Background
Most major agricultural and urban areas in New Mexico today lie along the narrow corridor of the Rio Grande as it cuts across the center of this predominantly desert state. Spanish settlers arrived in the area in the late 1500s, followed by Mexican and American settlers in the 18th and 19th centuries, building large irrigation systems and diversion dams to allow agricultural production in the arid region. In the early 1920s, water supply in the Rio Grande basin was already severely stressed, and studies were conducted as to the feasibility of procuring additional water by transbasin diversion from tributaries of the San Juan River. 

The 1933–1934 Bunger Survey studied potential locations for diversions and storage reservoirs, and in 1939, the Rio Grande Compact was signed, dividing Rio Grande waters between Colorado, New Mexico, and Texas including allocations from a potential future diversion from the San Juan basin. When the Upper Colorado River Basin Compact was established in 1948, it also included provisions for the tentative diversion project under its water allotment to New Mexico. In the 1950s, post-World War II population growth in central New Mexico put even larger strains on the Rio Grande's water, and the need for a transbasin water project rose because water supplies in the area quickly became overallocated.

Studies for the project continued through the early 1950s, but actual implementation languished until 1962 when Congress amended the Colorado River Storage Act of 1956, allowing the diversion of part of New Mexico's share of Colorado River basin waters into the Rio Grande basin. The project would be constructed in two phases. Resultantly, only the first phase of the project was ever constructed, delivering just under 47% of the original amount proposed by Reclamation.

On December 19, 1964, construction began on the Azotea Tunnel, the main water tunnel for the project, running from the Navajo River south to Azotea Creek in the Rio Chama watershed. Work started on the Oso and Little Oso tunnels in February 1966, and construction on the Blanco Tunnel began in March of the same year. In 1967, an enlargement of the outlets of existing El Vado Dam to accommodate increased flows from the diversion project was completed, and construction began on Heron Dam, which would impound the project's main storage reservoir. Azotea Tunnel was holed through and construction was finished on the project's three diversion dams in 1970. Heron Dam was completed the next year. Nambe Falls Dam, completed in 1976, was the last part of the project to be built. The dam was the only one built of a series of small independent irrigation units originally proposed under the project to serve Native American lands. In 1978, Reclamation announced the completion of the San Juan–Chama Project.

Project description

Diversion works

The San Juan–Chama Project taps the water of the Rio Blanco, Navajo, and Little Navajo Rivers via a series of small diversion dams, tunnels, and siphons. The water passes underneath the river via the Little Oso Siphon and connects to the Oso Tunnel.

Oso Diversion Dam on the Navajo diverts additional water into the Oso Feeder Conduit, which joins with water from the Oso Tunnel and Siphon to form the Azotea Tunnel. The tunnel terminates at Azotea Creek, a tributary of Willow Creek, which is in turn a tributary of the Rio Chama. The lower portion of Azotea Creek has been channelized to mitigate erosion from the higher flows.

Storage facilities

The dam and reservoir are functionally independent from the other facilities of the San Juan–Chama Project.

Water allocations
Surplus water is also used to maintain a permanent pool at the Cochiti Lake flood-control reservoir on the Rio Grande.

Panoramic views

See also
Colorado River Storage Project
Rio Grande Project
Rio Grande dams and diversions

References

Engineering projects
Irrigation projects
United States Bureau of Reclamation
Interbasin transfer
Colorado River Storage Project